Time Machine is the 13th studio album by German-based English progressive rock band, Nektar. It is their first album of new material in over four years following Book of Days; their previous release Spoonful of Time was a covers album. It is final studio album to feature Roye Albrighton before his death in July 2016.

Track listing 
All songs written by Roye Albrighton, unless indicated otherwise.
 "A Better Way" – 9:17
 "Set Me Free, Amigo" – 5:01*
 "Destiny" – 5:16*
 "If Only I Could" – 9:55
 "Time Machine" – 8:06
 "Tranquility" – 5:06
 "Mocking the Moon" (Barbel Craven, Klaus Henatsch) – 5:24
 "Talk to Me" (Ron Howden) – 3:55*
 "Juggernaut" – 4:37
 "Diamond Eyes" – 10:14

Note: (*) CD/digital-only tracks; not on vinyl LP.

Personnel

Nektar 
 Roye Albrighton – guitars, vocals
 Ron Howden – drums, vocals 
 Klaus Henatsch – keyboards
 Billy Sherwood – bass

Production 
 Brian Perera – executive producer
 Billy Sherwood – engineer, mixer
 Roye Albrighton – mixer
 Maor Appelbaum – mastering

External links

References 

Nektar albums
2013 albums